Darryl "Tony" Robertson (born January 1, 1956) is a former American basketball shooting guard in the National Basketball Association (NBA) for the Atlanta Hawks and Golden State Warriors. He played college basketball at West Virginia University.

Early years
Born in Detroit, Michigan, he attended Southwestern High School. As a senior, he contributed to the team winning the state championship, while scoring 20 points and 9 rebounds per game.

College career
Robertson enrolled at Eastern Arizona Junior College. As a freshman, he averaged 21 point, 5 assists and 8 rebounds per contest. As a sophomore, he averaged 23 points, 6 assists and 10 rebounds per game. He set Dodge City Tournament records with 93 points and 42 field goals, while helping his team finish in second place. He received All-tournament and honorable-mention All-American honors. 

Robertson transferred to West Virginia University for his junior season. He averaged 17.9 points, 3.6 assists and 4.4 rebounds. 

As a senior, he scored 18.1 points, 3.3 assists and 4.0 rebounds. He had a career-high 34 points and 10 assists against Richmond University. He made a career-high 12 rebounds against the University of New Hampshire. He posted 7 steals against Virginia Tech University. 

Robertson registered 57 starts, 1,026 points, while averaging 18.0 points (seventh in school history), 3.4 assists and 4.2 rebounds per game in two seasons. 

In 2020, he was inducted into the West Virginia University Sports Hall of Fame.

Professional career
Robertson was selected by the Los Angeles Lakers in the fourth round (88th overall) of the 1977 NBA draft. On October 17, he was traded to the Atlanta Hawks in exchange for a 1979 fourth round pick (#79-Ray White). 

In 1977, he averaged 5.9 points, 1.6 assists, 1.2 steals and 4.4 rebounds. On September 21, 1978, he was waived by the Atlanta Hawks. 

On February 18, 1979, he signed as a free agent with the Golden State Warriors, to provide depth after Phil Smith was lost for the season with an Achilles injury.

On June 21, 1981, he was invited by the Atlanta Hawks to participate in a three-day rookie and free-agent camp. He wasn't signed at the end of the workout sessions.

References

External links

Living people
1956 births
American men's basketball players
Atlanta Hawks players
Basketball players from Detroit
Eastern Arizona Gila Monsters men's basketball players
Golden State Warriors players
Los Angeles Lakers draft picks
Shooting guards
Southwestern High School (Michigan) alumni
West Virginia Mountaineers men's basketball players